Phototrexate is a photochromic antifolate drug developed at the Institute for Bioengineering of Catalonia (IBEC, The Barcelona Institute of Science and Technology). In particular, it is a photopharmacological agent that behaves as light-regulated inhibitor of the dihydrofolate reductase (DHFR) enzyme. Phototrexate is a photoisomerizable structural analogue of the chemotherapy agent methotrexate. It is also an example of "azologization". Pharmacological effects of phototrexate can be switched on and off by UVA and visible light, respectively. Phototrexate is almost inactive in its trans configuration while it behaves as a potent antifolate in its cis configuration. It can also spontaneously self-deactivate in the dark.

See also 
 Cancer
 Psoriasis
 Psoriatic arthritis

References

External links 
 The Barcelona Institute of Science and Technology

Dihydrofolate reductase inhibitors
Chemotherapy